Gordon Timlin Purdy (1 July 1888 – 22 December 1974) was a Liberal party member of the House of Commons of Canada, 1935-1945 and 1953–1957. He was born in East Amherst, Nova Scotia and became a lumber merchant by career.

He was first elected to Parliament at the Colchester—Hants riding in the 1935 general election then re-elected there in 1940. Purdy was defeated in the 1945 election by Frank Thomas Stanfield. When Stanfield left federal politics, Purdy won Colchester—Hants in the
1953 election. After serving his final House of Commons term, the 22nd Canadian Parliament, Purdy was defeated by Cyril Kennedy of the Progressive Conservative party in the 1957 election.

Electoral Record

References

External links
 

1888 births
1974 deaths
Members of the House of Commons of Canada from Nova Scotia
Liberal Party of Canada MPs